Merritt Woods Natural Area (formerly Merritt Orchard Park) is a  park and natural area in the Portland, Oregon metropolitan area's Cedar Mill suburb, in the United States.

References

Parks in Washington County, Oregon